The designation CB400 has applied to ten Honda motorcycle families:
 CB400F (1975–1977)  
  SOHC, inline-four. 6-speed manual gearbox
 CB400A Hawk Hondamatic (1978)
  SOHC, 6-valve, parallel-twin. 2-speed automatic gearbox
 CB400TI Hawk I (1978–1979) 
  SOHC, 6-valve, parallel-twin. 5-speed manual gearbox
 CB400TII Hawk II (1978–1979) 
  SOHC, 6-valve, parallel-twin. 5-speed manual gearbox
 CB400N (1978–1986) 
  SOHC, 6-valve, parallel-twin
 CB400T Hawk (1980–1981) 
  SOHC, 6-valve, parallel-twin. 6-speed manual gearbox
 Honda CB-1 (CB400F) (1989–1990)
  DOHC, 16-valve, inline-four. 6-speed manual gearbox
 CB400 Super Four (1992–present)
  DOHC, 16-valve, inline-four. 6-speed manual gearbox
 CB400 Four (NC36, 1997–2001)
  DOHC, 16-valve, inline-four. 5-speed manual gearbox
 CB400SS (NC41, 2002–2006)
  SOHC, 4-valve, single-cylinder. 5-speed manual gearbox
 CB400F (NC47, 2013–2016)
  DOHC, 8-valve, parallel-twin. 6-speed manual gearbox

CB440S 
The Honda CB440S was a special version offered by a Honda dealership in São Paulo, Brazil in 1983. This was a CB400 with a 447 cc engine with some imported parts as lightweight crankcase, larger pistons and new suspension arms.

References

External links 
 pressportal.com.au 2009 model review
 mynrma.com.au 2008 model review

Set index articles on vehicles
CB400